"Sally Cinnamon" is a single released by the band the Stone Roses in 1987. The song was the second single released by The Stone Roses, and was released before bassist Mani joined the band. It was not included in their first studio album two years later. The lyrics were written entirely by Ian Brown, who did so for the majority of the band's early tracks.

The single entered the UK Indie Chart in June 1987, spending thirty-nine weeks in the chart in total, peaking at number three. When re-released in 1989 it entered the UK Singles Chart where it spent seven weeks, peaking at number 46.

When the single was re-released, the band refused to make a video for their former label, resulting in the label making a video which the band took objection to in January 1990, by trashing the offices of their former label by throwing paint and by throwing it over Paul Birch, as well as destroying several cars.  This incident resulted in a court case that saw the band get off with a £6,000 fine and a ban from entering the premises of their former label.

Track listing
All songs written by Brown/Squire.

1987 release
12" vinyl (Black/FM Revolver 12 REV36)
no barcode, Made in England on back cover
 "Sally Cinnamon" (3:27)
 "Here It Comes" (2:41)
 "All Across the Sands" (2:45)

1989 and 1992 reissues
7" vinyl (Black/FM Revolver REV36)
 "Sally Cinnamon" - 2:53
 "Here It Comes" – 2:41

12" vinyl (Black/FM Revolver 12 REV36)
with barcode, Made in W. Germany on back cover
 "Sally Cinnamon" - 3:27
 "Here It Comes" – 2:41
 "All Across the Sands" – 2:45

Cassette (Black/FM Revolver REV MC 36), CD (Black/FM Revolver REV XD 36)
1992 CD released in a slimline case
 "Sally Cinnamon" (Single Mix) - 2:53
 "Sally Cinnamon" (12" single Mix) - 3:27
 "All Across the Sands" – 2:45
 "Here It Comes" – 2:41

The tracklisting on the back of the 1992 CD release has "All Across The Sands" and "Here It Comes" listed the wrong way round.

2005 EP issue
Due to chart regulations, this release was not eligible to chart as a single in 2005

CD&DVD (Black/FM Revolver REV XD 636)
Disc 1 (CD)
 "Sally Cinnamon (Single Mix)" – 2:53
 "Here It Comes" – 2:41
 "All Across the Sands" – 2:45
 "Sally Cinnamon" (12" single Mix) - 3:27

Disc 2 (DVD)
 "Sally Cinnamon" (Video)

Charts

Certifications

References

External links
The Definitive Stone Roses Discography entry

1987 singles
The Stone Roses songs
Songs written by John Squire
Songs written by Ian Brown
1987 songs
Jangle pop songs